Pamela Weisshaupt (born 2 March 1979 in Zurich) is a Swiss rower.

References 
 

1979 births
Living people
Swiss female rowers
Rowers from Zürich
World Rowing Championships medalists for Switzerland
21st-century Swiss women